William Njobvu (born 4 March 1987) is a Zambian football midfielder who played for Zanaco. Njovu also played for Hapoel Ironi Kiryat Shmona in Israel and Lusaka Dynamos in Zambia before signing a five-year contract with the Israeli team effective since July 2009. He scored against Spain in the 2007 FIFA Youth World Cup where Zambia received a bye to the zambianfootball.net.

International career

International goals
Scores and results list Zambia's goal tally first.

Honours 
Lusaka Dynamos
 Zambian Challenge Cup: 2008

Hapoel Ironi Kiryat Shmona	
 Toto Cup: 2009–10, 2010–11, 2011–12
 Liga Leumit: 2009–10
 Israeli Premier League: 2011–12

References

External links 
 Zambiafootball website
 

1987 births
Living people
Zambian footballers
Zambia international footballers
Zambian expatriate footballers
2008 Africa Cup of Nations players
2010 Africa Cup of Nations players
Association football midfielders
Lusaka Dynamos F.C. players
Hapoel Ironi Kiryat Shmona F.C. players
Hapoel Be'er Sheva F.C. players
Enosis Neon Paralimni FC players
Beitar Tel Aviv Bat Yam F.C. players
Power Dynamos F.C. players
Kabwe Warriors F.C. players
National Assembly F.C. players
Nkwazi F.C. players
Zanaco F.C. players
Liga Leumit players
Israeli Premier League players
Cypriot First Division players
Expatriate footballers in Israel
Expatriate footballers in Cyprus
2013 Africa Cup of Nations players
Zambian expatriate sportspeople in Israel
Zambian expatriate sportspeople in Cyprus
2006 Africa Cup of Nations players
2009 African Nations Championship players
Zambia A' international footballers